The Miletin is a right tributary of the river Jijia in Romania. It discharges into the Jijia near Vlădeni. It flows through the villages Cristești, Coșula, Copălău, Chițoveni, Prăjeni, Miletin, Plugari, Șipote and Vlădeni.

Tributaries
The following rivers are tributaries to the river Miletin (from source to mouth):
Left: Pârâul Putred, Valea Rea, Pârâul lui Vasile, Recea
Right: Chirui, Horoghiuca, Varnița, Scânteia, La Moara de Vânt

References

Rivers of Romania
Rivers of Botoșani County
Rivers of Iași County